This is a list of Philippine Basketball Association imports by the highest total number of points scored in their stint or tenure with the league.

 Statistics accurate as of January 16, 2023.

See also 

 List of Philippine Basketball Association players

References 

Philippine Basketball Association
Lists of Philippine Basketball Association players